Pleasure Point may refer to:
 Pleasure Point, New South Wales, Australia
 Pleasure Point, California, United States